Psara palpalis is a moth in the family Crambidae. It was described by George Hampson in 1918. It is found in Cameroon and Malawi.

References

Spilomelinae
Moths described in 1918